Playhouse is a British television anthology series that ran from 1967 to 1983, which featured contributions from playwrights such as Dennis Potter, Rhys Adrian and Alan Sharp. The series began in black and white, but was later shot in colour and was produced by various companies for the ITV network, a format that would inspire Dramarama. The series would mostly include original material from writers, but adaptations of existing works were also produced (such as the 1979 production of M.R. James' horror story Casting the Runes). 

Actors appearing in the series included Leslie Anderson, Gwen Nelson, Ricky Alleyne, Pat Heywood, Michael Elphick, Ian Hendry, Edward Woodward, Margaret Lockwood, Jessie Matthews, Basdeo Panday, and Lloyd Peters.

See also
 Armchair Theatre
 ITV Play of the Week
 Theatre 625
 The Wednesday Play
 Play for Today
 Second City Firsts
 Thirty-Minute Theatre

References

1967 British television series debuts
1983 British television series endings
British drama television series
ITV television dramas
1960s British drama television series
1970s British drama television series
1980s British drama television series
1960s British anthology television series
1970s British anthology television series
1980s British anthology television series
Black-and-white British television shows
English-language television shows
Television series by Yorkshire Television
Television shows produced by Thames Television
Television shows produced by Granada Television
Television shows produced by Anglia Television
Television shows produced by Associated-Rediffusion
Television shows produced by Associated Television (ATV)